Arindam Sil is an Indian actor, film director and line producer who predominantly works in Bengali films..

Early life 
Sil was born on 12 March 1964 in North Calcutta to a traditional joint family. He was a student of St. Joseph's College, Calcutta, and St. Xavier's College, Kolkata, from where he passed ICSE, ISC & B Com (Hons) examinations. He then pursued M.B.A. in marketing from the Indian Institute of Social Welfare and Business Management at the University of Calcutta. He gave up his PhD at USA to pursue his interest in becoming an actor. In 2012 he directed a movie Aborto. Sil and his company, Nothing Beyond Cinema, has managed the line-production of films like The Bong Connection, Via Darjeeling, 033, Brake Fail, Shukno Lanka, Nobel Chor, Kahaani, Detective Byomkesh Bakshi, TE3N, Meri Pyari Bindu', among others.

Filmography

Director

Actor 
 Afghaani Snow (2023)
 Lost (2022)
 Tirandaj Shabor (2022)
 Mahananda (2022)
 Bhalo Meye Kharap Meye (2019)
 Durgeshgorer Guptodhon (2019)
  Finally Bhalobasha (2019)
Guptodhoner Sondhane (2018)
 Eagoler Chokh (2016) (cameo)
 Har Har Byomkesh (2015) (cameo)
 Shudhu Tomari Jonyo (2015) Nayantara's Father
 Buno Haansh (2014)
 Kaal Madhumas (2013)
 Target Kolkata (2013)
 Asbo Aar Ekdin (2012)
 Laptop (2012) Raya's Father
 Nobel Chor (2012)
 Arekti Premer Golpo (2010)
 Ekti Tarar Khonje (2010)
 Sob Choritro Kalponik (2009)
 Brake Fail (2009)
 Via Darjeeling (2008)
 Tolly Lights (2008)
 Chalo Let's Go (2008)
 Bow Barracks Forever (2007)
 The Bong Connection (2007)
 Netaji Subhas Chandra Bose: The Forgotten Hero (2005)
 Dwitio Paksha (2004)
 Mahulbanir Sereng (2004)
 Annadaata (2002)
 Debdas (2002)
 Moner Majhe Tumi (2002)
 Cancer (2001)
 Hey Ram (2000)
 Shesh Thikana (2000)
 Sankha Sindurer Dibyi (1999)
 Shatru Mitra (1999)
 Swapno Niye (1999)
 Tumi Ele Taai (1999)

Executive producer 
 Meri Pyaari Bindu (2017)
 Kahaani 2: Durga Rani Singh (2016)
 Te3n (2016)
 Detective Byomkesh Bakshy!
 Gunday (2014)
 Kahaani (2012)
 Nobel Chor (2012)
 Shukno Lanka (2010)
 033 (2010)
 Brake Fail (2009)
 Via Darjeeling (2008)
 The Bong Connection (2007)

See also 
 Pijush Ganguly
 Paran Bandopadhyay

References

External links 
 
 

Living people
Male actors in Bengali cinema
1964 births
Bengali film directors
Film directors from Kolkata
Indian Institute of Social Welfare and Business Management alumni
University of Calcutta alumni
Male actors from Kolkata
Film producers from Kolkata
Bengali film producers
21st-century Indian film directors
21st-century Indian male actors
Indian male film actors